Stanisława Nowicka (1905–1990) was a Polish dancer and singer born in Warsaw.

She gave Jerzy Petersburski's famous Tango Milonga (known in Europe as Oh Donna Clara) its debut in the Morskie Oko cabaret, 1929. "[The] low and sensuous timbre of her voice made Nowicka not only the master interpreter of tangos, but also of Russian romances and the French chanson." She was famous for her Apache songs (she danced the Apache tango with Tadeusz Olsza) and covered much of Marlene Dietrich's repertoire

In 1936 the Polish daily Slowo Polskie sent her to New York as correspondent; she never returned. She remained active as a singer in the United States, performing with poet Julian Tuwim in 1942 at Carnegie Hall. She led the Polish National Dance school in New Jersey and did some translation work. She read tarot cards and had a clairvoyance studio in Yorktown; she was active in the American Theosophical Society. She died in Yorktown in 1990.

References

Polish cabaret performers
1905 births
1990 deaths
20th-century Polish women singers
20th-century comedians